OJSC Power Machines (translit. Siloviye Mashiny abbreviated as Silmash) is a Russian energy systems machine-building company founded in 2000. It is headquartered in Saint Petersburg.

Power Machines manufactures steam turbines with capacity up to 1,200 MWe, including turbines for nuclear power plants.  Its portfolio consists of turbine generators for the Leningrad Nuclear Power Plant II and the Novovoronezh Nuclear Power Plant II. Also, Power Machines has supplied equipment to 57 countries other than Russia with significant market in Asia.

History
The company was created in 2000.

 69.92% of shares were owned by Highstat Limited, a company controlled by Alexei Mordashov. 25% of shares were owned by Siemens and 5.08% by minor shareholders.

In December 2011, Highstat acquired Siemens's stake in Power Machines for less than US$280 million (3.6 rubles per share), below the market price (4.9 rubles per share). Power Machines was subsequently delisted from the MICEX-RTS stock exchange. In August 2012, Highstat made a mandatory offer of 4.53 rubles (US$0.139) per share to the remaining minority shareholders, which the Investor Protection Association said was significantly undervalued. Following a complaint filed by the association, the Federal Financial Markets Service fined Highstat 250,000 rubles.

Structure
 Leningradsky Metallichesky Zavod (1857 establishment),
 Electrosila (1898 establishment),
 Turbine Blades’ Plant (1964 establishment),
 Kaluga Turbine Works (1964 establishment),
 NPO CKTI named after I. I. Polzunov (1927 establishment),
 Energomashexport (1966 establishment),
 Power Machines – Reostat Plant (1960 establishment).

Products
 GTE180 development, GTE170 production, GTE160, GT100, GTE-150, GTE-250 GTE-300 projects, GTE65, unit M94yu2 (Licensed V94.2 Siemens SGT5-2000E in 1994)
 SGTT build licensed SGT5-2000E (GTE160 GTE180 TPE180), SGT5-4000F, SGT-600 (Baltika-25)
 Silmash Gas and Steam Turbines K- and T- for Power Plants (Nuclear Thermal and Hydroelectric)

Management
The Board of Directors consists of eight members:
 From Severstal-group - Alexey Mordashov, Alexey Yegorov, Vladimir Lukin
 From Power Machines - Igor Kostin (General Director), Vadim Chechnev
 From Universal Invest - Igor Voskresensky
 From Siemens - Michael Zuss, Hans-Jurgen Vio

References

External links 
  Official website of Power Machines

 
Industrial machine manufacturers
Steam turbine manufacturers
Gas turbine manufacturers
Engineering companies of Russia
Water turbine manufacturers
Nuclear technology companies of Russia
Russian companies established in 2000
Russian brands
Companies formerly listed on the Moscow Exchange
Manufacturing companies established in 2000